Georgia women's national floorball team is the national team of Georgia in floorball.  The team participated in the Qualification to the B-Division for the 2009 Floorball Women's World Championship.  The qualifiers were held in Idrija, Slovenia. The team did not advance out of qualifiers.

References 

Women's national floorball teams
F